In boolean logic, logical nor or joint denial is a truth-functional operator which produces a result that is the negation of logical or. That is, a sentence of the form (p NOR q) is true precisely when neither p nor q is true—i.e. when both of p and q are false.

The NOR operator is also known as Peirce's arrow. Peirce, in unpublished manuscripts, first considered it as a logical operator, and showed that it can express logical NOT, AND, and OR. Stamm, Sheffer, and Nicod were the first to discuss it in print. Quine introduced the symbol  for it. As with its dual, the NAND operator (a.k.a. the Sheffer stroke—symbolized as either ,  or ), NOR can be used by itself, without any other logical operator, to constitute a logical formal system (making NOR functionally complete). Other ways of notating  include, P NOR Q, and "Xpq" (in Bocheński notation).

The computer used in the spacecraft that first carried humans to the moon, the Apollo Guidance Computer, was constructed entirely using NOR gates with three inputs.

Definition

The NOR operation is a logical operation on two logical values, typically the values of two propositions, that produces a value of true if and only if both operands are false.  In other words, it produces a value of false if and only if at least one operand is true.

Truth table

Logical Equivalences

The logical NOR  is the negation of the disjunction:

Properties
Logical NOR does not possess any of the five qualities (truth-preserving, false-preserving, linear, monotonic, self-dual) required to be absent from at least one member of a set of functionally complete operators. Thus, the set containing only NOR suffices as a complete set.

Other Boolean Operations in terms of the Logical NOR

NOR has the interesting feature that all other logical operators can be expressed by interlaced NOR operations. The logical NAND operator also has this ability.

Expressed in terms of NOR , the usual operators of propositional logic are:

See also

 Bitwise NOR
 Boolean algebra
 Boolean domain
 Boolean function
 Functional completeness
 NOR gate
 Propositional logic
 Sole sufficient operator
 Sheffer stroke as symbol for the logical NAND

References

External links

NOR

de:Peirce-Funktion
it:Algebra di Boole#NOR
Charles Sanders Peirce